Aleksei Popov may refer to:

 Aleksei Arkadyevich Popov (born 1990), Russian football player
 Aleksey Dmitrievich Popov, Soviet theatre director
 Alexey Popov (born 1974), Russian journalist
 Aleksei Vladislavovich Popov (born 1978), Russian-born Kazakhstani footballer